The Valdivia culture is one of the oldest settled cultures recorded in the Americas. It emerged from the earlier Las Vegas culture and thrived on the Santa Elena peninsula near the modern-day town of Valdivia, Ecuador between 3500 BCE and 1500 BCE.

Culture

Remains of the Valdivia culture were discovered in 1956 on the western coast of Ecuador by the Ecuadorian archeologist Emilio Estrada, who continued to study this culture. American archeologists Clifford Evans and Betty Meggers joined him in the early 1960s in studying the type-site.

The Valdivia lived in a community that built its houses in a circle or oval around a central plaza. They were believed to have a relatively egalitarian culture of sedentary people who lived mostly off fishing, though they did some farming and occasionally hunted for deer to supplement their diet. From the archeological remains that have been found, it has been determined that Valdivians cultivated maize, kidney beans, squash, cassava, chili peppers and cotton plants. The latter was processed, spun and woven to make clothing.

Valdivian pottery, dated to 2700 BCE, initially was rough and practical, but it became splendid, delicate and large over time. They generally used red and gray colors, and the polished dark red pottery is characteristic of the Valdivia period. In their ceramics and stone works, the Valdivia culture shows a progression from the most simple to much more complicated works.

The trademark Valdivia piece is the "Venus" of Valdivia: feminine ceramic figures. The "Venus" of Valdivia likely represented actual people, as each figurine is individual and unique, as expressed in the hairstyles. The figures were made joining two rolls of clay, leaving the lower portion separated as legs and making the body and head from the top portion. The arms were usually very short, and in most cases were bent towards the chest, holding the breasts or under the chin.

A display of Valdivian artifacts is located at Universidad de Especialidades Espíritu Santo in Guayaquil, Ecuador.

Influences on Valdivia culture

Ceramic phase A of the Valdivia was long thought to be the oldest pottery produced by a coastal culture in South America, dated to 3000-2700 BCE. In the 1960s, a team of researchers proposed there were significant similarities between the archeological remains and pottery styles of Valdivia and those of the ancient Jōmon culture, active in this same period on the island of Kyūshū, Japan). They compared both decoration and vessel shape, pointing to techniques of incising. The Early to Middle Jomon pottery had antecedents dating 10,000 years, but the Valdivia pottery style seemed to have developed rather quickly. In 1962 three archeologists, Ecuadorian Emilio Estrada and Americans Clifford Evans and Betty Meggers suggested that Japanese fishermen had gotten blown to Ecuador in a storm and introduced their ceramics to Valdivia at that time. Their theory was based on the idea of diffusion of style and techniques.

Their concept was challenged at the time by other archaeologists, who argued that there were strong logistical challenges to the idea that Japanese could have survived what would have been nearly a year and a half voyage in dugout canoes. The cultures were separated by a distance of 15,000 km (8,000 nautical miles). Researchers argued that Valdivia ceramics (and culture) had developed independently, and those apparent similarities were a result simply of constraints on technique, and an "accidental convergence" of symbols and style.

In the 1970s, what is believed widely to be conclusive evidence refuting the diffusion theory was found at the Valdivia type-site, as older pottery and artifacts were found below these excavations. Researchers found what is called San Pedro pottery, pre-dating Phase A and the Valdivia style. It was more primitive. Some researchers believe pottery may have been introduced by people from northern Colombia, where comparably early pottery was found at the Puerto Hormiga archaeological site. In addition, they think that the maize at Valdivia was likely introduced by people living closer to Meosamerica, where it was domesticated. In addition, other pottery remains of the San Pedro style were found at sites about 5.6 miles (9 km) up the river valley.

Additional research at both several coastal sites, including San Pablo, Real Alto, and Salango, and Loma Alta, Colimes, and San Lorenzo del Mate inland have resulted in a major rethinking of Valdivian culture. It has been reclassified as representing a "tropical forest culture" with a riverine settlement focus. There has been major re-evaluation of nearly every aspect of its culture.

References

External links 

  Ecuadorian Archaeology
 Valdivia stone carving

Pre-Columbian cultures
History of Ecuador
Indigenous peoples in Ecuador
Indigenous peoples of the Andes
Archaeology of Ecuador
4th millennium BC
Archaic period in the Americas